Little feather or Littlefeather may refer to:

Achillea millefolium, plant known as yarrow or little feather
Sacheen Littlefeather (1946–2022), an American actress and activist
Isaac Littlefeathers a 1984 Canadian film